Liechtenstein Bus (trading as LIEmobil)  is a bus company based in Vaduz, Liechtenstein.  The company operates a total of 19 petrol-powered buses and 27 diesel buses on a network of 25 routes throughout Liechtenstein. Many services operated by Liechtenstein Bus venture over the borders into Switzerland and Austria.

At Schaan-Vaduz bus station, all buses arrive at the same time, so passengers can quickly change between the different routes.

At the tourist center at Schaan-Vaduz bus station, passengers can get free information about public transport in Liechtenstein.

Holders of a Swiss Travel Pass can travel for free on Liechtenstein’s buses.

References

External links
 Liechtenstein Bus website

Bus companies of Liechtenstein
organizations based in Vaduz